Alcozauca de Guerrero is one of the 81 municipalities of Guerrero, in south-western Mexico. The municipal seat lies at Alcozauca de Guerrero. The municipality covers an area of 55,160 hectares.

As of 2005, the municipality had a total population of 16,237.

Climate

References

Municipalities of Guerrero